The Keyser Limestone Formation is a geologic formation in West Virginia. It preserves fossils dating back to the Silurian period.

See also

 List of fossiliferous stratigraphic units in West Virginia

References
 

Geologic formations of West Virginia
Devonian southern paleotemperate deposits